The Brabant killers, also named the Nijvel Gang in Dutch-speaking media, and the mad killers of Brabant in French-speaking media, are responsible for a series of violent attacks that mainly occurred in the Belgian province of Brabant between 1982 and 1985. A total of 28 people died and 22 were injured. The actions of the gang, believed to consist of a core of three men, made it Belgium's most notorious unsolved crime spree. The active participants were known as The Giant (a tall man who may have been the leader); the Killer (Le Tueur; the main shooter) and the Old Man (Le Vieux; a middle aged man who drove). The identities and whereabouts of the "Brabant killers" are unknown. Although significant resources are still dedicated to the case, the most recent arrests are of the now-retired original senior detectives themselves, for alleged evidence tampering.

The gang abruptly ceased their activities in 1985. The ensuing chaotic investigation failed to catch them or even make serious inroads into solving the case. This led to a parliamentary inquiry and public discussion, both of which revolved around the possibility that the gang members were Belgian or foreign state security elements either carrying out covert missions (disguising targeted assassinations) or conducting political terrorism.

Overview of crimes attributed to the gang

1981
December 31: Burglary at a Gendarmerie barracks in Etterbeek. Theft of automatic weapons, ammunition, and a car. Some of these items were later allegedly recovered in a garage belonging to Madani Bouhouche.

1982
March 13: Theft of a 10-gauge fowling shotgun from a store in Dinant, Belgium. Two men were seen running away. 
May 10: Theft at gunpoint of an Austin Allegro. One of two such instances in which the Killer was seen without a mask. He spoke French, apparently as a first language and with the inflection of an educated man. The car was dumped almost immediately. Theft of a Volkswagen Santana from a car showroom.
August 14: Armed robbery of a grocery store in Maubeuge, France. Food and wine were stolen. Two French police officers were shot and seriously wounded when they arrived on the scene while the goods were being loaded into a vehicle.
September 30: Armed robbery of a weapons dealer in Wavre, Belgium. Fifteen firearms were stolen, including sub-machine guns. A policeman was killed at the scene; two others were shot and seriously wounded later.
December 23: Armed robbery of a restaurant in Beersel, Belgium. Coffee and wine were stolen. The caretaker was tortured and killed.

1983
January 9: Robbery and murder of a taxi driver in Brussels, Belgium. The car was later found in Mons, Belgium.
January 28: Theft of a Peugeot at gunpoint.
February 11: Armed robbery of a supermarket in Rixensart, Belgium. Less than $18,000 was stolen. Several people were wounded. No one was killed. 
February 22: An Audi 100 with bullet holes from the February 11 incident was stolen from a commercial garage where it was being repaired, but quickly abandoned.
February 25: Armed robbery of a supermarket in Uccle, Belgium. Less than $16,000 was stolen. No one was killed.
March 3: Armed robbery and murder at a supermarket in Halle, Belgium. Less than $18,000 was stolen. One supermarket-staff member was killed.
May 7: Armed robbery of a supermarket in Houdeng-Gougnies, Belgium. Less than $22,000 was stolen. No one was killed.
September 10: Armed robbery and murder at a textile factory in Temse, Belgium. Seven bullet-proof jackets were stolen. A worker was killed and his wife severely wounded. The firm had recently begun manufacturing the jackets (for the police) which was not widely known.
September 17: A couple were murdered in the early hours after stopping their Mercedes at a 24-hour self-service gas station beside a store that the gang was burgling. Despite the alarm going off, the gang took the time to load twenty kilos of tea and coffee and 10 litres of cooking oil. Two gendarmes responding to the alarm were shot as they arrived on the scene; one was killed, the other seriously wounded. The gang escaped in a Saab turbo stolen on February 22 and the murdered couple's Mercedes. After shooting up a police car that began following them, the gang used a little-known minor road to get away in the Saab; after unsuccessful attempts to destroy the car by shooting the petrol tank, they left it near to the garage from which the Audi had been stolen (also linked to the Volkswagen hijacked in 1982, and close to the Delhaize supermarket that would be attacked on September 27, 1985). Investigators believe that the repeated propinquity may indicate that some members lived in the area. Potentially crucial evidence collected from the Saab 'disappeared'.
October 2: Armed robbery of a restaurant in Ohain, Belgium. Nothing was stolen. The owner was killed.
October 7: Armed robbery of a supermarket in Beersel, Belgium. Less than $35,000 was stolen. One customer was killed.
December 1: Armed robbery of a shop in Anderlues and murder of the couple who owned it. About 3,000 Euros of jewelry was stolen. The owner's wife was instantly killed without warning as the gang entered. The owner attempted to defend himself with a pistol, but was shot dead. The gang destroyed a surveillance camera recording before leaving. The stolen Volkswagen used had fake license plates copied from a legitimately owned Volkswagen of the same model that was linked to the garage where the Audi was taken, and where the new Volkswagen taken at gunpoint in 1982 was bought.

1985
September 27: Armed robbery at the Delhaize supermarket on rue de la Graignette in Braine-l'Alleud. Less than $6,000 was stolen. Three people were killed and two wounded. Between 15 and 25 minutes later, there was an armed robbery of the Delhaize supermarket on Brusselsesteenweg in Overijse. Less than $25,000 was stolen. Five people were killed and one wounded.

As a result of these robberies, security was increased at many stores in the region — including armed guards.

November 9, around 7:30 p.m.: Armed robbery at the Delhaize supermarket on the Parklaan in Aalst. This market was outside the area the gang usually operated in. They arrived while an armed patrol that checked the supermarket was still present. A family of four encountered the perpetrators in the parking lot after they left the shop and the mother, father, and daughter were killed apparently without motive. The surviving boy from the family ran back into the shop where he was singled out and shot at point blank range; he was very badly wounded in the hip. Less than $25,000 was taken, and eight people were killed with several others seriously injured. Gang members (wearing bizarre face paint and disguises) roared at and taunted customers. They also were reportedly laughing and smiling during the gratuitous shootings, which were done by the "Killer". The robbers did not leave the scene right away after returning to their parked getaway vehicle. The patrol vehicle from Belgium's Rijkswacht/Gendarmerie backed some distance away when shooting started; the municipal police arrived, although many of their cars had refused to start, but mainly remained at an exit of the parking lot that was well away from the gang. The getaway began with the "Giant" walking alongside the getaway car. A policeman fired his revolver at the gang's VW, which went through an unblocked exit and sped away. Rijkswacht/Gendarmerie vehicles stayed put, but a police van pursued the gang for a few kilometers.

In November 1986, the discovery in a canal of various items and weapons taken or used in the gang's crimes provided important evidence. A long running dispute erupted over the find, amid assertions that the location was checked in 1985; therefore the weapons could not have been there from before that time and a second search must have been done with guilty knowledge. In 2019, the now-retired officers responsible for ordering the 1986 search were officially questioned on suspicion of manipulating the investigation, but they protested that original search of the canal was not an underwater inspection by frogmen, as done in 1986. A Volkswagen Golf car — similar to that used in the getaway — had been found burned out in 1985 in woods relatively close by to the canal, however it was said the condition of the items meant they could not have been immersed since that time.

Method of operation
The items taken and paraphernalia they disposed of seemed to indicate that the gang were shooting enthusiasts involved in drug dealing and burglaries, combining their criminal activity with daytime jobs such as food preparation or scrap metal dealing. Under this interpretation, the crimes were largely for material reward and escalated out of bravado. On the other hand, odd elements were also evident:
 Robbery proceeds were modest relative to the extreme risks. Early raids were often amateurish – for example, the Giant not wearing gloves, and the Killer and the Old Man allowing themselves to be seen without masks while taking a car at gunpoint.
 The pause in the raids and the killings followed by the escalated resumption in 1985, when a nine-year-old girl and other bystanders were shot dead for no reason in the parking lot before the gang had entered the supermarkets.
 Firearms were a particular interest; the 12-gauge pump shotguns used were loaded with a rare buckshot similar to that used by Group Diane (a former special forces unit of the Belgian Gendarmerie). Some policemen thought the gang used tactics in gunfights very similar to those taught on police courses.
 The cars used, often Volkswagens, were stripped of distinctive trim and had vehicle modifications including repainting, indicating a mechanic's facilities and expertise, but also a desire to retain VW parts.
 Getaway routes were well planned and navigated at top speed, but the gang were often still on the scene when armed police arrived.

The gang is believed to have had at least one helper on its last raid. In 1986 weapons that the gang had were found along with bullet proof jackets and other items in a canal about 30 km outside Brussels. The Winchester pump shotguns used in the massacres were never found.

Ulterior motives

Official complicity 
Certain events surrounding the robbery of the Delhaize supermarket in Aalst on 9 November 1985 served to further strengthen media-fuelled rumours of a connection between the gang and elements of the Belgian military and the Belgian Gendarmerie in particular. For example, the supermarket was hit despite patrols passing it every twenty minutes and gendarmes close to the scene did not engage or pursue the robbers. Although no such connection has been officially proven, the lack of satisfactory performance in the Brabant killers case was among the reasons for the subsequent abolishing of the Belgian Gendarmerie.

A connection to the clandestine stay-behind network S.D.R.A VIII (Operation Gladio) has also been suggested. However, an official parliamentary inquiry found no substantive evidence that the network was involved in any terrorist acts or that criminal groups had infiltrated it.

A supposed connection between the Brabant killers, Gladio, and the by-then defunct Belgian far-right organisation Westland New Post led by Paul Latinus is mentioned in the 1992 BBC Timewatch documentary series Operation Gladio, directed by Allan Francovich, in which it is suggested that Latinus said that his organisation was sanctioned by the Belgian government.

Westland New Post 
In March 1981, Paul Latinus and members of Front de la Jeunesse founded Westland New Post, a paramilitary far-right group that was investigated after a 1980 incident in which a member shot at a group of North Africans, causing one death and a national outcry. The killer was with a firearms enthusiast who was a friend of Madani Bouhouche, and decades later let him stay in a French property after Bouhouche was released on licence from a life sentence for two murders. The milieu of WNP included a former member (now deceased) of the French terrorist group OAS, and several others from the Front de la Jeunesse who conducted paramilitary firearms training in some of the forested areas that were later used by the Brabant killers. The WNP was a secret organisation. Speculation about a connection to the Brabant killers increased after former WNP members — including the only Gendarmerie — recalled being ordered to covertly surveil and compile a report on security arrangements at Belgian supermarkets of a large chain that was targeted by the killers. WNP had a genuine intelligence operative advising on covert techniques; NATO behind-the-lines units are known to have used the planning of robberies as a training exercise. Michel Libert, the former second-in-command of Westland New Post, admitted passing on Latinus's orders to gather detailed information on supermarkets with a view to robberies, but denied knowing of any purpose to the assignments beyond developing clandestine skills.

Marcel Barbier, an enforcer-type WNP member who lived with Libert, was arrested in August 1983 after a shooting, and became suspected in a double murder at a synagogue a year earlier. Latinus went to police and informed them that Barbier and another WNP member had committed the synagogue murders, and that he (Latinus) had helped Barbier get rid of the murder weapon. This caused dissension within the WNP as Latinus was seen as having betrayed a member of the organisation. Also in 1983 several members of WNP who were in Front de la Jeunesse (Belgium) were convicted of organising it as an illegal militia, and given terms in prison. Leading WNP members were also arrested for unauthorised possession of low-level classified NATO documents. Latinus committed suicide in April 1984, and his followers formed rival cliques. Some theories have connected these facts to the inactivity of the Brabant Killers gang between December 1983 and September 1985, and them having a seemingly intensified grudge against society during the supermarket massacres of 27 September and 9 November 1985.

Barbier was convicted for the synagogue murders. His co-accused, WNP member Eric Lamers, was acquitted of murder but received 5 years for other offences, and in 1991 was convicted of a separate double murder. Lammers fled the country after being accused of a sexual exposure against a child and accessing images of child sex abuse. After he was brought back from Serbia he appeared in a 2014 Belgian TV program in which he accused WNP leaders of being behind the Brabant killings, based on WNP reconnaissance on the supermarket chain whose premises were subjected to the murderous attacks of 1985. Libert was arrested as a suspect soon after the program was broadcast, but released without charge after 48 hours. In 2018 a former subordinate of Libert publicly accused him of being the 'Giant', although without any official reaction. Libert went on television to yet again deny the allegations, and said the accuser had mental health difficulties.

Other speculation
Various conspiracy theories link the killings to political scandals, illegal gun-running mafias, and legitimate businesses, suggesting they were done to disguise targeted assassinations. It has been suggested that one of the supposed victims of these assassinations was the banker Léon Finné, who was shot by the gang during the robbery of the Delhaize supermarket in Overijse on 27 September 1985.

Possible suspects 
Notorious professional criminals, including Patrick Haemers and Madani Bouhouche (both deceased) have been canvassed as likely suspects. Haemers's height made him an apparent fit for the Brabant gang's 'Giant', but his known crimes lacked the gratuitous violence and small-time takings that were the Brabant killers' hallmark.

Bouhouche was a former gendarme and gun shop owner suspected and known to have been involved in a number of violent crimes. He was arrested in 1986 for the murder of Juan Mendez, an acquaintance of his who had expressed his fear that some weapons stolen from him by Bouhouche had been used in the Brabant killers crimes. Although he was released in 1988, police had found that Bouhouche had anonymously rented garages to store stolen cars, weapons he had stolen in a 1981 burglary of a Gendarmerie guard station in Etterbeek, and false duplicate car plates, some of which could have a connection to the Brabant killers. Also, items thought to have been abandoned by the Brabant killers turned out to include several TV remote controls adapted for triggering explosions, not unlike Bouhouche had intended to use in a complex extortion scheme involving IED attacks against a supermarket chain years before the Brabant killers started targeting supermarkets. This and all other evidence seemingly connecting him to the Brabant killers was considered inconclusive, but did little to allay the suspicion that he may have had inside information about the Brabant killers. He eventually died in 2005 while employed by a rental accommodation business owned by an old shooting and Westland New Post acquaintance.

Investigation 
In 1983, on the basis of a forensic examination of a weapon, and a witness who said he had seen the Saab hidden, authorities charged the gun owner (a former municipal policeman) and several other men ("Borains") with the Brabant killings. Police said they obtained incriminating statements containing guilty knowledge. The Brabant killers' jewelry shop double murder occurred while the "Borains" accused were in detention. After it was found that a German ballistic experts' report discrediting the main hard evidence against the accused had been suppressed by the prosecutor, charges against the "Borains" were dismissed, and the freed men furiously alleged they had been coerced in abusive 36 hour interrogations, and supplied with details for false confessions. The original "Borains" suspect was unsuccessfully approached for information in 2015.

An initially promising lead for the enquiry concerned a member of a family of Romany origin that was well known in the underworld, who led a group of armed robbers. He was charged with being one of the Brabant Killers and at one point made (later retracted) admission to having participated without his gang in the massacres, but provided no details, and the line of investigation proved fruitless.

The law enforcement agencies hunting the killers made many mistakes during the early years of the investigation, often as a result of rivalries among the various authorities. Among the worst oversights were failure to preserve cars the gang modified and dumped, and loss of items with fingerprints. The original investigating magistrate was criticized for lack of professionalism by mishandling evidence and not considering alternatives to his hypotheses. Publicity about the case and the offer of a substantial reward resulted in a vast number of tips from ordinary Belgians with personal scores to settle, thereby diverting investigative resources from viable suspects.

Current lines of inquiry
Most suspects date back to the beginning of the investigation, and have been repeatedly questioned over the years. The latest was Christiaan Bonkoffsky, ex-Gendarmerie unit Group Diane, who before his alcohol-related 2015 death made a confession to being the so-called Giant. A riot gun and ammunition basket labelled "Gendarmerie-Politie", were apparently dumped by the Brabant killers (possibly after having been stolen by them). Bonkoffsky had already been scrutinised as a potential suspect in 2000. Investigators utilising forensic DNA and fingerprints have definitely ruled him out as the Giant.

In June 2020 Belgian detectives appealed for information on the identity of man in a photograph sent to police in 1986. They reissued a photo of a man holding a SPAS-12 in a forest. The photo was reissued on the orders of a judge. They also appealed for information on the identity of a man with a 3.5 cm wine stain birthmark on the nape of his neck who took part in one of the gang's raids on a Delhaize supermarket in Beersel on the southern outskirts of Brussels in October 1983.

A special extension to the statute of limitations on the case runs out in 2025, by which time the core members of the gang would be in their mid seventies at least, if still alive.

In the media 
In 2018 Stijn Coninx directed the Belgian film Don't Shoot (Niet Schieten), screenplay by Stijn Coninx and Rik D'Hiet. It is based on the last, November 9, 1985 bloody raid by the Brabant Killers on the Delhaize Supermarket in Aalst. Eight innocent people were murdered, among whom were Gilbert and Thérèse Van de Steen and their daughter Rebecca. Their nine-year-old son David although critically injured in the leg, survived the shooting and was raised by his grandparents. It follows the 25 year long battle of David's grandfather, Albert (played by Jan Decleir), to bring the killers to justice.

See also
 List of fugitives from justice who disappeared
 Operation Gladio

References

External links

 Official website of police investigation
 Chronologie des faits attribués aux tueurs du Brabant page 21–22
 bendevannijvel.com/forum » Forum
 Belgian Chamber of Representatives, parliamentary investigation into the Brabant killers. 
 Belgian Chamber of Representatives, parliamentary investigation into banditism. 
 Belgian Senate, parliamentary investigation into Gladio 
 Belgian Senate, parliamentary investigation into private militias 

1982 in Belgium
1983 in Belgium
1984 in Belgium
1985 in Belgium
1982 murders in Belgium
1983 murders in Belgium
1984 murders in Belgium
1985 murders in Belgium 
1980s murders in Belgium
Belgian mass murderers
Belgian serial killers
Belgian spree killers
Gangs in Belgium
History of Walloon Brabant
Nivelles
Terrorism in Belgium
Terrorist incidents in Belgium in the 1980s
Unidentified serial killers
Unsolved mass murders
Unsolved murders in Belgium
Controversies in Belgium
Political controversies in Belgium
Serial mass murderers